Dasymutilla quadriguttata is a species of velvet ant in the family Mutillidae.

References

Further reading

External links

 

Parasitic wasps
Mutillidae